Walter Fields (16 March 1879 – 7 February 1942) was a Barbadian cricketer. He played in three first-class matches for the Barbados cricket team from 1907 to 1913.

See also
 List of Barbadian representative cricketers

References

External links
 

1879 births
1942 deaths
Barbadian cricketers
Barbados cricketers
People from Saint Michael, Barbados